Balacra affinis is a moth of the  family Erebidae. It was described by Rothschild in 1910. It is found in Cameroon and the Democratic Republic of Congo.

References

Balacra
Moths described in 1910
Insects of the Democratic Republic of the Congo
Erebid moths of Africa